Asaphocrita pineae is a moth in the family Blastobasidae. It was described by Hans Georg Amsel in 1962. It is found in Guatemala.

References

Arctiidae genus list at Butterflies and Moths of the World of the Natural History Museum

pineae
Moths described in 1962